Richard Huxley (5 August 1940 – 11 February 2013) was an English musician who was the bassist for the Dave Clark Five, a group that was part of the British Invasion.

Biography 
Born at Livingstone Hospital, Dartford, Kent, he joined the group in 1958, and played on all of the band's hits including "Glad All Over" and "Bits and Pieces". He was the only member of the group who did not write songs. After the group disbanded in 1970, Huxley pursued a career in property development but maintained an involvement in the music business.  He was in attendance for the ceremonial induction of the group into the Rock and Roll Hall of Fame in March 2008, along with Lenny Davidson and Dave Clark.

Death 
Huxley died 11 February 2013, at the age of 72, after suffering from emphysema for some years. His second wife Anne had died a year previously.

References

External links

1940 births
2013 deaths
English rock bass guitarists
Male bass guitarists
People from Dartford
Deaths from emphysema
Musicians from Kent
The Dave Clark Five members
20th-century English musicians
Beat musicians